Burondi is a coastal village near to Dapoli in the southern state of Maharashtra in India.  It has a small population mostly working in fishing and working in merchant Navy. You can find fresh fish in Burondi market. Most of fish of Burondi is exported to Mumbai, Goa , Mangalore etc. One can find a quality Alphonso(hapus) mangoes over there in season..

it attracts the tourists for a nice beach..

Villages in Ratnagiri district